Nicolas d'Ailleboust de Manthet, also known as Nicolas de Manthet, born 1664, killed in action 1709, was a Canadian captain in the French marines serving in Canada. He was one of the leaders of the French and Indians at the Schenectady massacre 1690.

Military career
De Manthet fought in many battles during his military career. In 1689 he participated in an attack against the Senecas at the Lake of Two Mountains, thereby saving that years fur trade from capture. Together with Jacques le Moyne de Sainte-Hélène he led 114 Canadians and 96 allied Indians in the attack on Schenectady in 1690. He also participated in the raid against the Mohawk towns in 1692. It was when leading an attack against Fort Albany in the Hudson Bay that he was killed in action.

References

Citations

Cited literature
 
 Pritchard, James (2004). In search of Empire. Cambridge University Press.

1664 births
1709 deaths
People of New France
Canadian nobility (French)
Pre-Confederation Quebec people
Military history of Canada
King William's War
Queen Anne's War